"Klan" is a song by Italian singer Mahmood. It was released as a digital download and for streaming on 14 May 2021 by Island Records. The song was written by Alessandro Mahmoud, Davide Petrella, Dardust, Marc Seguí and Xavibo, and produced by Dardust. It was included in Mahmood's second album Ghettolimpo.

Music video
A music video to accompany the release of "Klan" was first released onto YouTube on 19 May 2021. The video was directed by Attilio Cusani and shot in Palermo and at "Fiumara d'arte" open-air museum in the Metropolitan City of Messina, Sicily.

Personnel
Credits adapted from Tidal.
 Dardust – associate performer, producer, composer, drum machine
 Davide Petrella – author
 Mahmood – associated performer, author, vocals
 Marc Seguí – author
 Xavibo – author

Track listing

Charts

Certifications

References

2021 singles
2021 songs
Island Records singles
Mahmood (singer) songs
Songs written by Dario Faini
Songs written by Mahmood
Songs written by Davide Petrella